The 2013 FINA Men's Water Polo World League was played between November 2012 and June 2013, and was open to all men's water polo national teams.

Super Final
The Super Final was playing from 11–16 June 2013 in Chelyabinsk, Russia.

Qualified teams

Group A

Group B

Knockout stage

5th–8th Places

Final ranking

Awards
 Top Scorer
 Vanja Udovičić

References

External links

 Official site

World League, men
FINA Water Polo World League
International water polo competitions hosted by Russia